Karim Aït-Fana (born 25 February 1989) is a Moroccan professional footballer who plays as a striker. Having represented France at various youth levels, he has made three appearances for the senior Morocco national team.

Aït-Fana can play in a variety of attacking positions, which include playing in the hole, as a winger, and in the attacking midfield position. Though born in France, Aït-Fana's father is from Azrou and his mother is from Meknes.

Club career

Montpellier
Aït-Fana was born in Limoges and began his career playing for his local club, Air Limoges. At the age of thirteen, he was selected to attend the Centre de Formation de Châteauroux, a regional youth academy that is comparable to that of the Clairefontaine academy, in order to receive further training. While training at Châteauroux during the week, he played with hometown club Limoges FC on the weekends. After spending two years at the academy, he joined Montpellier.

Aït-Fana made his professional football debut on 12 May 2006, the final match day of the 2005–06 season, coming on as a late-match substitute playing nine minutes in a 1–0 loss to Le Havre. The following season, his playing time increased to 13 matches. He also scored his first goal during this season on 27 April 2007 against LB Châteauroux in a 3–1 defeat. Aït-Fana's role in the team was greatly expanded for the 2007–08 season as he appeared in 37 total matches. He scored his only two goals for the season in the final league match of the season against FC Libourne-Saint-Seurin, which Montpellier won 5–0.

Montpellier earned promotion to Ligue 1 following the club's successful campaign during the 2008–09 season with Aït-Fana having an influential role. He scored a career-high six goals during the campaign including the winner against Guingamp late in the season with the club in the midst of a promotion battle. Due to his successful season, Aït-Fana was given a contract extension with the club until the year 2012. In his first season with Montpellier in Ligue 1, Aït-Fana was a revelation in the team, which reached as high as secondnd position in the league. He has scored impressive goals against Sochaux, Boulogne, Le Mans, and Marseille. Montpellier went undefeated in the five league matches Aït-Fana has scored in.

In Montpellier's last home game of the 2011–12 campaign, Aït-Fana scored a last minute goal in a 1–0 win over Lille after coming off the bench.

Nîmes Olympique

Consolat GS
In early January 2018, Aït-Fana left Championnat National side GS Consolat.

Wydad Casablanca
In late January, Aït-Fana joined reigning African champions Wydad AC, agreeing a 1.5-year deal. In August 2018 Aït-Fana revealed, that few days after signing the contract, he learned that his contract was not certified for an administrative history and he then went back to France.

Gallia Lucciana
In January 2019, Aït-Fana joined Gallia Club Lucciana in the Championnat National 3.

International career
Aït-Fana has been active on the international youth circuit for France. He has earned limited caps with the under-16s, under-17s, under-18s, and the under U-19 squad. After not representing France for over a year and a half, it was speculated that he would follow in the footsteps on fellow French-born Moroccan Marouane Chamakh and play for Morocco, his country of origin. However, on 1 October 2009, he was called up to the France under-21 team by coach Erick Mombaerts for their 2011 UEFA European Under-21 Football Championship qualification matches against Malta on 9 October and Belgium on 13 October. He made his debut in the Malta match appearing as a substitute in the 76th minute. Despite being on the pitch for mere seconds, he scored France's second goal of the match ensuring them a 2–0 victory.

Aït-Fana made his debut with the national team of Morocco in a friendly match against Senegal held on 25 May in Marrakech.

Personal life
Aït-Fana is Muslim.

Career statistics

Club

Honours
Montpellier
 Ligue 1: 2011–12

References

External links
 
 
 
 

Living people
1989 births
French Muslims
Moroccan Muslims
Sportspeople from Limoges
Association football midfielders
French footballers
Moroccan footballers
French sportspeople of Moroccan descent
Montpellier HSC players
Nîmes Olympique players
Athlético Marseille players
Wydad AC players
Ligue 1 players
Ligue 2 players
Championnat National players
Footballers from Nouvelle-Aquitaine